Frédéric Delpla (born 9 November 1964) is a French fencer. He won a gold medal in the team épée event at the 1988 Summer Olympics.

References

External links
 

1964 births
Living people
French male épée fencers
Olympic fencers of France
Fencers at the 1988 Summer Olympics
Olympic gold medalists for France
Olympic medalists in fencing
People from Creil
Medalists at the 1988 Summer Olympics
Sportspeople from Oise
20th-century French people